John Buchanan was a Scottish footballer, who played for Cambuslang and Scotland.

References

Sources

External links

London Hearts profile

Year of birth missing
Year of death missing
Scottish footballers
Scotland international footballers
Cambuslang F.C. players
Association football wing halves